Regional championships of Ukraine (football) are football competitions in Ukraine among amateurs that are organized by regional organizations. All regional football organizations are members of the FFU Council of Regions.

Members 
There are 26 members. In each region conducts its on championship, while most of them has the second and the third tiers of league competitions. Each region also conducts a regional cup competitions as well as some additional regional tournaments. Along with it each regional federation has several smaller regional federations of its own (raion and city federations).

 
Ukraine
Amateur association football